Phillip Carroll (born March 1847) was an American politician. He served as a member of the Florida House of Representatives.

Life and career 
Carroll was born in Maryland. He was a farmer.

In 1881, Carroll was elected to the Florida House of Representatives, representing Leon County, Florida, serving until 1883.

References 

1847 births
Year of death missing
Members of the Florida House of Representatives
19th-century American politicians
Farmers from Florida
People from Leon County, Florida